HO or H0 is a rail transport modelling scale using a 1:87 scale (3.5 mm to 1 foot). It is the most popular scale of model railway in the world.

The name H0 comes from 1:87 scale being half that of 0 scale, which was originally the smallest of the series of older and larger 0, 1, 2 and 3 gauges introduced by Märklin around 1900. Rather than referring to the scale as "half-zero" or "H-zero", English-speakers have consistently pronounced it  and have generally written it with the letters HO.

History

After the First World War there were several attempts to introduce a model railway about half the size of 0 scale that would be more suitable for smaller home layouts and cheaper to manufacture. H0 was created to meet these aims. For this new scale, a track width of 16.5 mm was designed to represent prototypical standard gauge track, and a model scale of 1:87 was chosen. By as early as 1922 the firm Bing in Nuremberg, Germany, had been marketing a "tabletop railway" for several years. This came on a raised, quasi-ballasted track with a gauge of 16.5 mm, which was described at that time either as 00 or H0. The trains initially had a clockwork drive, but from 1924 were driven electrically. Accessory manufacturers, such as Kibri, marketed buildings in the corresponding scale.

At the 1935 Leipzig Spring Fair, an electric tabletop railway, Trix Express, was displayed to a gauge described as "half nought gauge", which was then abbreviated as gauge 00 ("nought-nought"). Märklin, another German firm, followed suit with its 00 gauge railway for the 1935 Leipzig Autumn Fair. The Märklin 00 gauge track that appeared more than ten years after Bing's tabletop railway had a very similar appearance to the previous Bing track. On the Märklin version, however, the rails were fixed to the tin 'ballast' as in the prototype, whilst the Bing tracks were simply stamped into the ballast, so that track and ballast were made of a single sheet of metal.

HO scale trains elsewhere were developed in response to the economic pressures of the Great Depression. The trains first appeared in the United Kingdom, originally as an alternative to 00 gauge, but could not make commercial headway against the established 00 gauge. However, it became very popular in the United States, where it took off in the late 1950s after interest in model railroads as toys began to decline and more emphasis began to be placed on realism in response to hobbyist demand. While HO scale is by nature more delicate than 0 scale, its smaller size allows modelers to fit more details and more scale track distance into a comparable area.

In the 1950s HO began to challenge the market dominance of 0 gauge and, in the 1960s, as it began to overtake 0 scale in popularity, even the stalwarts of other sizes, including Marx and Lionel Corporation began manufacturing HO trains.

Today, HO locomotives, rolling stock (cars or carriages), buildings, and scenery are available from a large number of manufacturers in a variety of price brackets.

Standards

Scale

HO is the most popular model railroad scale in both continental Europe and North America, whereas OO scale (4 mm:foot or 1:76.2 with 16.5 mm track) is still dominant in the United Kingdom. There are some modellers in the United Kingdom who model in HO scale and the British 1:87 Scale Society was formed in 1994.

The precise definition of HO scale thus varies slightly by country and manufacturer.

In other hobbies, the term HO is often used more loosely than in railroad modeling. In slot car racing, HO does not denote a precise scale of car, but a general size of track on which the cars can range from 1:87 to approximately 1:64 scale.

Even in model railroading, the term HO can be stretched. Some British producers have marketed railway accessories such as detail items and figures, as "HO/OO" in an attempt to make them attractive to modelers in both scales. Sometimes the actual scale is OO, and sometimes the difference is split (about 1:82). These items may be marketed as HO, especially in the US. In addition, some manufacturers or importers tend to label any small-scale model, regardless of exact scale, as HO scale in order to increase sales to railroad modelers. The sizes of "HO" automobiles, for example, can vary greatly between different manufacturers.

Power and control

Model locomotives are fitted with small motors that are wired to pick up power from the rails. As with other scales, HO trains can be controlled in either analog or digital fashions. With analog control, two-rail track is powered by direct current (varying the voltage applied to the rails to control speed, and polarity to control direction). With digital control, such as Digital Command Control (DCC) or proprietary systems such as the one developed by Märklin, digital commands are encoded at the controller and received by any decoders receiving power from the track. Digital control allows independent control of each locomotive's speed and direction as well as functions not easily achieved with analog control such as reactive sound and lighting effects, integration of auxiliary decoders and automation.

The basic power and control system consists of a power pack of a transformer and rectifier (DC), a rheostat. On large model layouts, the power system may consist of several signal boosters, control interfaces, switch panels and more. Trackage may be divided into electrically isolated sections called blocks and toggle or rotary switches (sometimes relays) are used to select which tracks are energized. Blocking trackage also allows the detection of locomotives within the block through the measurement of current draw.

Track
The "gauge" of a rail system is the distance between the inside edges of the railheads. It is distinct from the concept of "scale", though the terms are often used interchangeably in rail modelling. "Scale" describes the size of a modeled object relative to its prototype. Prototype rail systems use a variety of track gauges, so several different gauges can be modeled at the same scale.

The gauges used in HO scale are a selection of standard and narrow gauges. The standards for these gauges are defined by the NMRA (in North America) and the NEM (in Continental Europe). While the standards are in practice interchangeable, there are minor differences.

Construction

The earliest "pre-gauged" track available in the 1940s had steel rails clipped to a fiber tie base. This was called flexible track as it could be "flexed" around any curve in a continuous fashion.

As brass became more readily available, the steel rail was phased out, along with its corrosion problems. Brass flex-track continued to be available long after sectional track was introduced, as the three-foot lengths of rail reduced the number of joints. The biggest disadvantage of flex-track was that it had to be fastened to a roadbed.

In the late 1940s, Tru-Scale made milled wood roadbed sections, simulating ballast, tie plates and milled ties with a gauged, grooved slot with simulated tie plates. Bulk HO code 100 rail was spiked in place with HO spikes. This was available in straight lengths and curves, from  radius. 
It was up to the user to stain the wood for the tie colors prior to laying the brass track, and then adding scale ballast between the ties.

Tru-Scale made preformed wood roadbed sections, simulating ballast, that the flextrack would be fastened with tiny steel spikes. These spikes were shaped much like real railroad spikes, and were fitted through holes pre-drilled in the fiber flextrack ties base.

Sectional track was an improvement in setting up track on a living room floor because the rail was attached to a rigid plastic tie base, and could withstand rough handling from children and pets without suffering much damage. With flex track, which can be bent to any desired shape (within reason), it became possible to create railroads with broader curves, and with them more accurate models. Individual rails are available for those that wish to spike their own rails to ties. Individual ties can be glued to a sound base, or pre-formed tie and ballast sections milled from wood can be used for a more durable, if somewhat artificially uniform, look is preferred.

There are a variety of preassembled track sections made by Märklin using their three-rail system (where the third rail are actually studs protruding from the center of the rail tie). This trackwork is a little bulkier looking than true to scale, but it is considered quite trouble-free, and is preferred by many that are interested in reducing much of the operational problems that come with HO scale railroading. As with other preformed track, it is also available in several radius configurations. Generally speaking, very-sharp-radius curves are only suitable for single-unit operation, such as trolley cars, or for short-coupled cars and locos such as found around industrial works. Longer wheelbase trucks (bogies) and longer car and loco overhangs require the use of broader radius curves.

HO scale track was originally manufactured with steel rails on fiber ties, then brass rail on fiber ties, then brass rail on plastic tie. Over time, track made of nickel silver (an alloy of nickel and brass) became more common due to its superior resistance to corrosion. Today, almost all HO scale track is of nickel silver, although Bachmann, Life-Like and Model Power continue to manufacture steel track.

In America, Atlas gained an early lead in track manufacturing, and their sectional, flex, and turnout track dominates the US market. In the UK, Peco's line of flex track and "Electrofrog" (powered frog) and "Insulfrog" (insulated frog) turnouts are more common. Atlas, Bachmann, and Life-Like all manufacture inexpensive, snap-together track with integral roadbed. Kato also manufactures a full line of "HO Unitrack"; however, it has not yet caught on as their N scale Unitrack has.

As HO's commonly available rail sizes, especially the popular "code 100", are somewhat large (representative of extremely heavily trafficked lines), many modelers opt for hand-laid finescale track with individually laid wooden sleepers and crossties and rails secured by very small railroad spikes.

In Australia, many club-owned layouts employ code 100 track so that club members can also run OO-scale models and older rolling stock with coarse (deep) wheel flanges.

Couplers
A hook-and-loop coupler originally developed by Märklin became an NEM standard and is still widely used. More recently, manufacturers, including Fleischmann and Märklin, developed close couplers that on straight track have the buffers almost touching, more like the prototype. On curves a sliding mechanism allows the couplers to move away from the buffer frame providing the additional clearance necessary.

Most couplers provide pre-uncoupling, whereby a train may reverse over a raised uncoupler and some time later change direction leaving the train (or selected cars) behind.

Another NEM standard is the coupler pocket, which the individual coupler slots into. The majority of models provide this pocket, meaning that it is very simple to exchange one coupler type for another, or to replace damaged couplers.

In North America, all train sets/kits used to come with the "X2F" or "Horn Hook" coupler until Kadee came out with the No. 5 coupler.  After Kadee's patent ran out, other manufacturers made duplicates of the KD No. 5 until KD brought out the scale-accurate No. 58 coupler, and everyone else followed suit.

Models
Because of the scale's popularity, a huge array of models, kits and supplies are manufactured. The annual HO scale catalog by Wm. K. Walthers, North America's largest model railroad supplier, lists more than 1,000 pages of products in that scale alone. Models are generally available in three varieties:
 Ready-to-run models are fully ready for use right out of the box. Generally, this means couplers, trucks (bogies), and other integral parts are installed at the factory, although some super detailing parts may still need to be attached.
 Shake-the-box kits are simple, easy-to-assemble kits; a freight car might include a one-piece body, a chassis, trucks, couplers, and a weight, while a structure kit might include walls, windows, doors, and glazing. The name derives from the joke that no skill was required – shake the box, and the kit falls together. A common synonym is screwdriver kit as many can be assembled with a screwdriver and tweezers.
 Craftsman kits require a much higher level of skill to assemble and can include several hundred parts.
In addition to these kits, numerous manufacturers sell individual supplies for super detailing, scratch building, and kitbashing.

Quality varies extremely. Toylike, ready-to-run trains using plastic molds which are well over 50 years old are still sold; at the other are highly detailed limited-edition locomotive models made of brass by companies based in Japan and South Korea. A popular locomotive such as the F7/F9 may be available in thirty different versions with prices ranging from twenty to several thousand dollars or euros.

Comparison to other scales
HO scale's popularity lies somewhat in its middle-of-the-road status. It is large enough to accommodate a great deal of detail in finer models, more so than the smaller N and Z scales, and can also be easily handled by children. Models are usually less expensive than the smaller scales because of more exacting manufacturing process in N and Z, and also less expensive than S, O and G scales because of the smaller amount of material; the larger market and the resultant economy of scale also drives HO prices down. The size lends itself to elaborate track plans in a reasonable amount of room space, not as much as N but considerably more than S or 0. In short, HO scale provides the balance between the detail of larger scales and the lower space requirements of smaller scales.

Manufacturers

Currently active significant manufacturers and marketers of HO railroad equipment , include, but are not limited to:

ABR Model Works
Accurail
Acme Model Engineering Co.
Albrae Models
Arlo
Athabasca Scale Models
Athearn
Atlas

Auhagen
Auscision
Austrains
AWM
Bachmann Industries
BGR Group

Blackstone Models (HOn3)
Blair Line
BLMA Models
Bowser Manufacturing
Brawa
Brekina
Broadway Limited Imports
Busch
Campbell Scale Models
Century Foundry
Electrotren (part of Hornby)
ESU (Electronic Solutions Ulm)
Eureka
Exactrail
Faller
Fleischmann (part of Modelleisenbahn GmbH)
Frateschi
Fulgurex
HAG
Heki
Heljan
Herpa
Hodgdon Scale Models
Hornby Railways
Hunterline Craftsman Kits
Ibertren
InterMountain Railway
IHC
Island Modelworks
Jouef (part of Hornby)
Kadee
Kanamodel Products
Kato Precision Railroad Models
Katsumi Trains
Kibri
Kleinbahn
Lemaco
Life-Like
Liliput (part of Bachmann)
Lima — bankrupt in 2004, now part of Hornby
Lionel, LLC
Mantua
Märklin
Mehano
Micro Metakit
Model Power
MTH Electric Trains
MRmatiX
Noch
NMJ
Norev
Northwest Short Line (NWSL)
Peco
PIKO
Powerline Models
Precision Craft Models
Preiser
Rapido Trains
Rietze
Rivarossi (part of Hornby)
Roco (part of Modelleisenbahn GmbH)
ScaleTrains
SoundTraxx
Spectrum (trains) (part of Bachmann)
Stewart Hobbies
Spark
Summit USA
Tenshodo
Tillig
Trix (part of the Märklin group)
TMI Digital
Tyco
VK
Viessmann
Vollmer (company)
Wiking
Wm. K. Walthers
Woodland Scenics

Significant historical manufacturers and marketers of HO equipment that are no longer active in HO, include

Airfix
American Railroad Models (American Beauty)
Aristo-Craft
Associated Hobby Manufacturers (AHM)
Aurora Plastics Corporation
Balboa
L.M. Cox
Globe
Gützold (bankrupt in 2004)
Herkimer
Kembel
Ken Kidder
Lindberg Models
Lindsay Products
Marx
Olympic Express
Pacific Fast Mail (PFM)
Penn Line Manufacturing
Powerline Models
Revell
Sachsenmodelle (bankrupt in 2001, acquired by Tillig group)
Selley
Train Miniature
Trains Unlimited
Trainorama
Tru-Scale
True Line Trains
Trumpeter Models
Tyco Toys
Ulrich
Varney Scale Models

See also
 FREMO
 List of rail transport modelling scale standards
 Miniatur Wunderland
 Proto:87
 Rail transport modelling scales

References

External links

 Layout Tours A-L and Layout Tours M-Z
 Tony Cook's HO-Scale Trains Resource Includes separate Web sites for many classic and contemporary HO-scale model train product lines of the past; online catalog resources; plus links to current manufacturers.

Model railroad scales
Scale model scales